International Medical Corps is a global, nonprofit, humanitarian aid organization that provides emergency medical services, healthcare training and capacity building to those affected by disaster, disease or conflict." It seeks to strengthen medical services and infrastructure in the aftermath of crises."

International Medical Corps focuses on health services and training. This includes the prevention and treatment of infectious diseases; supplemental food for malnourished children; water, sanitation and hygiene; mental health and psychosocial care; and gender-based violence."

International Medical Corps is a founding member of One Campaign and a member of the Clinton Global Initiative.

History
The organization was founded in 1984 by Dr. Robert Simon, together with a group of American physicians and nurses. It is a private organization, with no political or religious affiliation. Simon is a professor in the Department of Emergency Medicine at Rush University, John H. Stroger Jr. Hospital of Cook County in Chicago. He is the former Bureau Chief of the Cook County Bureau of Health Services.

Current operations
International Medical Corps works in some 30 countries globally, providing relief to populations facing war, conflict, natural disaster, famine and poverty, while also laying the foundation for sustainable development. Its programs are funded from both public and private sources, including the United States Agency for International Development (USAID), the Directorate-General for European Civil Protection and Humanitarian Aid Operations (ECHO) and the Bill & Melinda Gates Foundation."

International Medical Corps is based in Los Angeles, with other offices in Washington, D.C.; London, England; and Split, Croatia. As of 2020, it employs 7,500 staff and has worked in 80 countries."

International Medical Corps has provided disaster relief for people impacted by the 2010 Haiti earthquake, the 2011 Tōhoku earthquake and tsunami, the Ebola virus epidemic in West Africa, and the April 2015 Nepal earthquake.

References

External links
 International Medical Corps – Official site
 International Medical Corps UK – UK website

Health charities in the United States
Organizations established in 1984
International medical and health organizations
Medical and health organizations based in California